The North Country Fair is an annual summer Solstice celebration held in the Driftpile Valley near Driftpile in northern Alberta, Canada.

References

External links

 lslncca.ca
Fairs in Alberta
Music festivals in Alberta
Music festivals established in 1979
Northern Alberta
Summer festivals
Summer events in Canada